Smetana is a crater on Mercury.  Its name was adopted by the International Astronomical Union (IAU) in 1985. The crater is named for Czechoslovakian composer Bedřich Smetana.

Smetana is highly eroded and overlain by many younger craters.  Some of the mountains within the crater appear to have hollows on them, as does an unnamed crater in the northwest quadrant of Smetana.

References

Impact craters on Mercury